Burkhard I, Lord of the House of Hohenzollern (born  before 1025; killed as part of a feud in 1061) is considered the first well-documented ancestor of the Hohenzollern dynasty.  Because of his name, it has been attempted to link the Hohenzollern family's descent to the medieval Burchardings family, but without success.  His father may have been Friedrich, a count in the Sülichgau area (roughly corresponding to today's Tübingen district).  His mother may have been Irmentrud, the daughter of Count Burkhard of Nellenburg.

In the annals of the monk Berthold of Reichenau from the year 1061, Buchardus de Zolorin and Wezil de Zolorin are mentioned.  Based on this source, Burkhard was killed due to a feud.  Little is known about the aforementioned persons themselves, or their possible relationship.

The next documented member of the dynasty is Frederick I, Count of Zollern, who was probably a son or a grandson of Burkhard I.

See also 
 House of Hohenzollern

References

External links 
 Page at genealogie-mittelalter.de
 Page at Genealogie Mittelalter - Mittelalterliche Genealogie im Deutschen Reich bis zum Ende der Staufer

Counts of Zollern
House of Hohenzollern
11th-century births
Year of birth uncertain
1061 deaths
11th-century German nobility